Limosininae is a subfamily of flies belonging to the family Sphaeroceridae, the lesser dung flies.

Genera
Genera include:

References

Sphaeroceridae
Brachycera subfamilies